Darryl Gunnlaugson is a Canadian curler.

Teams

Personal life
Gunnlaugson comes from an accomplished curling family. His father Lloyd represented Manitoba at the 1983 Labatt Brier. His son Jason is also an accomplished curler and his brother in-law Garry Vandenberghe is a World champion.

References

External links
 
 Darryl Gunnlaugson – Curling Canada Stats Archive

Living people
Canadian male curlers
World curling champions
Brier champions
Curlers from Winnipeg
Year of birth missing (living people)